This is the list of Tibetan monasteries of Tibetan Buddhism.

Gallery

References

External links 
Monastery List for Tibet, Mapping Buddhist Monasteries Wiki
Monastery list with coordinates

Tibetan architecture

Buddhist monasteries
Lists of Buddhist monasteries